Micropterix carthaginiensis is a species of moth belonging to the family Micropterigidae, native to Tunisia. It was described by John Heath in 1986. It is found in the marshland on the southern shore of Lake Ichkeul and at Jebel Boukornine, its type locality.

References

Endemic fauna of Tunisia
Micropterigidae
Moths described in 1986
Moths of Africa
Taxa named by John Heath